As Filhas da Mãe is a Brazilian telenovela produced and broadcast by TV Globo. It premiered on 27 August 2001, replacing Um Anjo Caiu do Céu, and ended on 19 January 2002, replaced by Desejos de Mulher. The telenovela is written by Silvio de Abreu, with the collaboration of Alcides Nogueira, Bosco Brasil, and Sandra Louzada.

It stars Fernanda Montenegro, Cláudia Raia, Andréa Beltrão, Bete Coelho, Patrícya Travassos, Thiago Lacerda, and Raul Cortez.

Cast 
 Fernanda Montenegro as Lucinda Maria Barbosa Cavalcante "Lulu de Luxemburgo"
 Cláudia Raia as Ramona Barbosa Cavalcante / Ramón Barbosa Cavalcante
 Andréa Beltrão as Tatiana Barbosa Cavalcante
 Bete Coelho as Alessandra Barbosa Cavalcante
 Patrícya Travassos as Milagros Quintana
 Thiago Lacerda as Adriano Araújo
 Raul Cortez as Arthur Brandão
 Alexandre Borges as Leonardo Brandão
 Regina Casé as Rosalva Rocha dos Anjos Cavalcante
 Tony Ramos as Manolo Gutierrez
 Cláudia Ohana as Aurora Áurea "Orora"
 Reynaldo Gianecchini as Ricardo Brandão
 Cláudia Jimenez as Dagmar Cerqueira
 Priscila Fantin as Joana Rocha dos Anjos
 Mário Frias as Diego Gutierrez
 Lavínia Vlasak as Valentine Ventura 
 Tuca Andrada as Nicolau "Nico" Rocha
 Diogo Vilela as Webster Pereira
 Virgínia Cavendish as Maria Leopoldina Pereira
 Yoná Magalhães as Violante Ventura
 Cleyde Yáconis as Georgina "Gorgo" Gutierrez
 Flávio Migliaccio as Barnabé
 Elias Gleizer as Deodoro Rocha "Seu Dedé"
 Bruno Gagliasso as José Carlos "Zeca" Rocha dos Anjos
 Pedro Garcia Netto as Pedro Rocha dos Anjos
 Viviane Novaes as Érika
 Lulo Scroback as Waldeck Ventura
 Nelson Xavier as Mauro das Flores
 Emiliano Queiroz as João Alberto
 Jacqueline Laurence as Margot de Montparnasse
 Cristina Pereira as Divina
 Nelson Freitas as Clóvis
 Gustavo Falcão as Faísca
 Marcelo Barros as Polenta
 Hilda Rebello as Dona Geralda
 Ana Beatriz Cisneiros as Amanda Rocha dos Anjos
 Felipe Latgé as Felipe "Felipinho" Augusto Pereira
 Isabella Cunha as Maria Elizabeth Pereira

References

External links 
 

2001 Brazilian television series debuts
2002 Brazilian television series endings
2001 telenovelas
2000s Brazilian television series
TV Globo telenovelas
Brazilian telenovelas
Portuguese-language telenovelas
Transgender-related television shows